Le Mars Municipal Park and Golf Course Historic District is a nationally recognized historic district located in Le Mars, Iowa, United States.  It was listed on the National Register of Historic Places in 2001.  At the time of its nomination the district consisted of 25 resources, including 11 contributing buildings, one contributing site, four  contributing structures, eight non-contributing buildings, and one non-contributing structure.

The city of Le Mars acquired  of land for the park in 1935 for $15,000, and it was dedicated later that year. The state agreed to carryout improving the park and building new facilities over a span of five years as Works Progress Administration (WPA) projects. Work on a nine-hole golf course began in 1936. It took at least five WPA projects to complete the work. The historic buildings and structures include: the west entrance portals, the custodian's cottage, a garage-service building, a small vehicle bridge, two artificial ponds, a bathhouse-shelter house, a Boy Scout/Girl Scout cabin, six Adirondack cabins, the clubhouse, and the golf course. This was one of the largest, if not the largest, recreational park constructed in Iowa in the 1930s. Nine more holes were added to the golf course in 1990, and a bike/walking path was completed in 1999.

References

Protected areas established in 1935
Le Mars, Iowa
Rustic architecture in Iowa
Buildings and structures in Plymouth County, Iowa
National Register of Historic Places in Plymouth County, Iowa
Historic districts in Plymouth County, Iowa
Parks on the National Register of Historic Places in Iowa
Historic districts on the National Register of Historic Places in Iowa
Works Progress Administration in Iowa
1935 establishments in Iowa